The NH Collection Open was a one-off golf tournament dual-ranked by the European Tour and the Challenge Tour. It was played for the only time in April 2014 at the La Reserva de Sotogrande Club de Golf in Cádiz, Spain.

Winners

Notes

References

External links
Coverage on the European Tour's official site

Former European Tour events
Former Challenge Tour events
Golf tournaments in Spain
Sport in Cádiz
Recurring sporting events established in 2014